Buriti de Goiás is a municipality in eastern Goiás state, Brazil.

Location and Communications
Distance to regional center (São Luís de Montes Belos):  58 km.
Highway connections are made by state highway BR-069 west from Goiânia, through Trindade, Santa Bárbara de Goiás, São Luís de Montes Belos, and then 58 kilometers northeast to Buriti de Goiás.  Neighboring municipalities are Córrego do Ouro, Fazenda Nova, Novo Brasil, Goiás, Mossâmedes, and Sanclerlândia.

The municipality contains part of the  Serra Dourada State Park, created in 2003.

Demographics
Population density in 2007: 11.23 inhabitants/km2
Population growth rate 2000-2007: -2.43.%
Urban population in 2007: 1,487
Rural population in 2007: 751
Eligible voters in 2007: 2638
City government in 2007: mayor (Altamiro Antônio da Silva), vice-mayor (José Sérgio Magno), and 09 councilpersons
Income distribution: In 823 households, 407 earned less than one minimum salary in 2000.

Economy
The economy is based on cattle raising, agriculture and small transformation industries.  In 2006 there were 24,000 head of cattle, including 3,570 head of milking cows.  There was modest production of rice, bananas, coconut, papaya, manioc, corn, and hearts of palm.

Health and education
Infant mortality in 2000: 24.88
Hospitals: 01 with 14 beds (2007)
Literacy rate: 86.8 in 2000
Schools: 03 in 2006
Students: 765
Higher education: none in 2006
MHDI:  0.731
State ranking:  142 (out of 242 municipalities)
National ranking:  2396 (out of 5507 municipalities)

See also
List of municipalities in Goiás
Microregions of Goiás

References

Frigoletto
Highway distances from Goiânia

Municipalities in Goiás